Uve or UVE may refer to 
An alternative spelling of the German masculine given name Uwe
 Ouvéa Airport in Ouvéa, New Caledonia (call sign UVE)
Uve Sabumei, Papua New Guinean rugby coach 
Uncorrelated volume element, a term used in the theory of composite materials